The E. A. Durgin House is a historic house at 113 Summer Street in Stoneham, Massachusetts.  The two-story wood-frame Second Empire style house was built c. 1870 for E. A. Durgin, a local shoe dealer, and is one of Stoneham's most elaborately styled 19th century houses.  Its main feature is a square tower with a steeply pitched gable roof that stands over the entrance.  The gable of the tower is clad in scalloped wood shingles, and includes a small window that is topped by its own gable.  The house has a typical mansard roof, although the original slate has been replaced with asphalt shingling, with a cornice that is decorated with dentil molding and studded by paired brackets.

The house was listed on the National Register of Historic Places in 1984.

See also
National Register of Historic Places listings in Stoneham, Massachusetts
National Register of Historic Places listings in Middlesex County, Massachusetts

References

Houses on the National Register of Historic Places in Stoneham, Massachusetts
Second Empire architecture in Massachusetts
Houses completed in 1870
Houses in Stoneham, Massachusetts